Mikhail Iosifovich Yakushin (Russian: Михаил Иосифович Якушин; 15 November 1910 – 3 February 1997) was a Russian football and field hockey player, later a manager of Dynamo Moscow and the USSR.

Playing career
Yakushin played football for Moscow clubs STS (1928–1929), SKiG (1931–1933), and Dynamo (1933–1944). He scored one goal in his three international matches for the Soviet national team. In the 1930s he also played field hockey for Dynamo, favoring hockey to football.

Coaching career
As a manager, he coached Dynamo Moscow from 1944 to 1950 and from 1953 to 1960, winning six Soviet titles (1945, 1949, 1954, 1955, 1957, 1959). He was the head coach of the USSR national football team in 1959 and from 1967 to 1968.

External links
Profile 

1910 births
Footballers from Moscow
1997 deaths
Soviet footballers
Soviet Top League players
FC Dynamo Moscow players
Soviet football managers
FC Dynamo Moscow managers
Soviet Union national football team managers
UEFA Euro 1968 managers
FC Lokomotiv Moscow managers
FC Dinamo Tbilisi managers
Pakhtakor Tashkent FK managers
Soviet ice hockey players
Jewish footballers
Association football midfielders
Recipients of the Order of the Red Banner of Labour
Honoured Masters of Sport of the USSR